George Henderson was a farmer and politician in Northern Ireland.

Henderson worked as a farmer in County Antrim.  Around the time of his retirement, he was appointed Chairman of the Unbought Tenants' Association.  Standing as a representative of that group, he won a seat in Antrim at the 1925 Northern Ireland general election.  The seat was abolished at the 1929 general election, and Henderson instead contested Bannside on behalf of the Ulster Liberal Party.  He took second place, and was not elected.  He also contested the Westminster seat of Antrim as a Liberal at the 1929 general election, but was not close to being elected.
He had two children, Arnold Henderson and Jean Middlemas Henderson

References

Year of birth missing
Year of death missing
Farmers from Northern Ireland
Liberal Party (UK) parliamentary candidates
Members of the House of Commons of Northern Ireland 1925–1929
Members of the House of Commons of Northern Ireland for County Antrim constituencies
Politicians from County Antrim
Ulster Liberal Party politicians
Unbought Tenants' Association members of the House of Commons of Northern Ireland